Torbjörn Blomdahl (born 26 October 1962 in Gothenburg) is a Swedish professional carom billiards (and to a lesser extent pool) player from Helsingborg, Sweden who plays for FC Porto. He is a seven time World Champion in three-cushion billiards, having won the titles in 1987, 1988, 1991, 1992, 1997, 2015 and in 2019.

Background
Torbjörn Blomdahl was born in Gothenburg but at age 11 he moved to Helsingborg. He is the son of three-cushion player Lennart Blomdahl, who was a driving force behind the local billiards club Borgen på Söder. It was here Blomdahl learned to play three-cushion with his father as the teacher. His international breakthrough was at the European championships in Copenhagen in 1984. Starting in 1989 he was ranked the best three-cushion player in the world.

Blomdahl has been a resident of Backnang, Germany since 1994.

Cue sports career
Blomdahl has won a total of 7 world UMB three-cushion world titles, placing him second to only Raymond Ceulemans who won 21. He is also the only Swede to ever be world champion. He's made 6 successful defenses, won 8 CEB European three-cushion titles which he defended successfully 4 times, and won 18 Swedish titles. His highest  is 24 and once made 50  in 9  (5.555 Average
).

Other tournaments Blomdahl won include the 2004 Carom Café International Tournament against Ramon Rodriguez and the first Sang Lee International Open by defeating Turkey's Semih Saygıner. In 2008 Blomdahl won the money-rich Agipi Masters tournament at the expense of Dick Jaspers.

Blomdahl has also excelled at pocket billiards, once defeating Korean pro Young Hwa-jeong and Filipino pro pool player Efren Reyes in both three-cushion, nine ball, and eight ball. He's also run 100 in straight pool.

References

External links
 Great shots by Torbjörn Blomdahl
 Torbjörn Blomdahl's High Run of 15 Points at  2007 Sang Lee International Open

1962 births
Living people
Swedish carom billiards players
Swedish pool players
World champions in three-cushion billiards
World Cup champions in three-cushion billiards
World Games silver medalists
Competitors at the 2009 World Games
Competitors at the 2005 World Games
Sportspeople from Helsingborg
20th-century Swedish people
21st-century Swedish people